The 2017 Liga Sudamericana de Básquetbol, or 2017 FIBA South American League, was the 22nd edition of the second-tier level continental professional club basketball competition in the South America, the FIBA South American League. Sixteen teams from across South America competed over three rounds, to determine the champion.

Team allocation

Teams

The labels in the parentheses show how each team qualified for the place of its starting round (TH: Americas League title holders):
LC: Qualified through a licensed club with a long-term licence
1st, 2nd, etc.: League position after Playoffs
CW: Cup winner

Group phase
Sixteen teams participated in the group phase, in which each team faced the other teams in the group once. Each group tournament was held at the arena of a host team. The two highest-placed teams in each group advanced to the semifinal phase. Games were played from 3 to 26 October 2017.

Group A
Venue: Quibdó, Colombia

Group B
Venue: Montevideo, Uruguay

Group C
Venue: Salvador, Brazil

Group D
Venue:

Semifinal phase
The eight teams which advanced from the group phase, played in this stage in which each team faced the other teams in the group once. Each group tournament was held at the arena of a host team. The highest-placed teams in each group advanced to the Grand Finals. Games were played from 7 to 16 November 2017.

Group E
Venue: Rio de Janeiro, Brazil

Group F
Venue: Barquisimeto, Venezuela

Grand Finals
The Grand Finals were decided in a best-of-five playoff format. Games were played on 6, 7, 13 and 14 December 2017. The team with the better record in the LSB would play Games 1, 2 and 5 (if necessary) at home.

|}

References

2018
2017–18 in South American basketball
2017–18 in North American basketball